Manuloc offers since 1964 full service contracts for maintenance of forklifts fleets.

Manuloc is a group of French service businesses specializing in distribution activity, counseling expertise, park maintenance equipment and industrial vehicles and logistics.

In addition to France, Manuloc is present in nine other countries: Belgium, Luxembourg, Poland, Romania, Russia, Slovakia, Turkey, Czech Republic, Switzerland.

In 2010, Manuloc had approximately 1200 employees with its subsidiaries Manuloc FMS, BFC, Dimatec, MAC 2, Sermat, Manuloc Alsace and Hyster Distribution, Philippe Manutention. It also owns shares in companies Multiparts, Kim, and Makolift.

Sources
Figaro article
 Les Échos article
Vidéo of Catherine Barthélémy during The Entrepreneurship Week
Stratégies Logistique article
"la Tribune" MANULOC EASTERN EUROPA article

References

See also 

 Forklift truck
 Polish site of Manuloc

Automotive companies of France
Business services companies established in 1964
Companies based in Metz
French companies established in 1964